The 1986 Iowa gubernatorial election was held on November 4, 1986. Incumbent Republican Terry Branstad defeated Democratic nominee Lowell Junkins with 51.91% of the vote.

Primary elections
Primary elections were held on June 3, 1986.

Democratic primary

Candidates
Lowell Junkins, State Senator
Robert T. Anderson, incumbent Lieutenant Governor
George Kinley, State Senator
Clinton E. Berryhill

Results

Republican primary

Candidates
Terry Branstad, incumbent Governor

Results

General election

Candidates
Terry Branstad, Republican
Lowell Junkins, Democratic

Results

References

1986
Iowa
Gubernatorial